Father of the Country could mean:

Pater Patriae or Father of the Nation, a Roman honorific
Father of the Nation
List of national founders